Scelodonta albidovittata is a species of leaf beetle from Namibia, Tanzania, Sudan, the Democratic Republic of the Congo and Rwanda, described by Joseph Sugar Baly in 1877.

Subspecies
There are two subspecies of S. albidovittata:

 Scelodonta albidovittata albidovittata Baly, 1877: The nominotypical subspecies. Found in Namibia, Tanzania, Sudan and the Democratic Republic of the Congo.
 Scelodonta albidovittata ruandensis Burgeon, 1941: Found in Rwanda.

References

Eumolpinae
Beetles of Africa
Beetles of the Democratic Republic of the Congo
Insects of Namibia
Insects of Rwanda
Insects of Sudan
Insects of Tanzania
Beetles described in 1877
Taxa named by Joseph Sugar Baly